Tom Tucker (3 October 1912 – 21 December 1982) was  a former Australian rules footballer who played with Collingwood in the Victorian Football League (VFL).

Notes

External links 
		
Tom Tucker's profile at Collingwood Forever

1912 births
1982 deaths
Australian rules footballers from Victoria (Australia)
Collingwood Football Club players